Aleksandr Vladimirovich Krasnykh (born 19 June 1995) is a Russian swimmer. He competed in the men's 400 metre freestyle event at the 2016 Summer Olympics.

References

External links
 

1995 births
Living people
Russian male swimmers
Olympic swimmers of Russia
Swimmers at the 2016 Summer Olympics
People from Bugulma
Medalists at the FINA World Swimming Championships (25 m)
World Aquatics Championships medalists in swimming
Russian male freestyle swimmers
European Aquatics Championships medalists in swimming
Swimmers at the 2020 Summer Olympics
Medalists at the 2020 Summer Olympics
Olympic silver medalists for the Russian Olympic Committee athletes
Olympic silver medalists in athletics (track and field)
Sportspeople from Tatarstan